Kua-nsi (Hedong Yi 河东彝) is a recently discovered Loloish language of Heqing County, Yunnan, China.

Gomotage, an undocumented and little-known Loloish language of Eryuan County, is also probably related to Kua-nsi (Yang 2010:7).

Distribution
The Kua-nsi live in the following villages of Liuhe Township 六合乡, northern Heqing County (Castro, et al. 2010:23).
Hedong 河东
Sangezhuang 三戈庄
Shang'eping 上萼坪
Wuxing 五星
Nanpo 南坡
Maidi 麦地
Longda 龙大

References

Loloish languages